Club Atlético General Lamadrid (usually General Lamadrid or simply Lamadrid) is an Argentine sports club located in Villa Devoto, Buenos Aires. The institution, founded in 1950, is mostly known for its football team, which currently plays in Primera C, the regionalised fourth division of the Argentine football league system.

Other sports practised at the club are futsal, handball, tae kwon do, roller skating and volleyball.

History 
On Saturday 21 March 2009, during a match facing Barracas Bolívar (now Sportivo Barracas), 18 Lamadrid players were sent off after they got into a violent confrontation with Barracas' supporters. The fight started when a group of youth players from Lamadrid (who were watching the match on their seats) began a discussion with some Barracas' fans. The discussion soon turn into a fight and the players from both teams jumped from field to the grandstand to take part on the fight as well.

Lamadrid won its second title in 2010–11 Primera C Metropolitana, therefore promoting to Primera B Metropolitana. Nevertheless, the poor campaigns done by the team caused it was relegated again at the end of 2011–12 season, where finished at bottom of table.

Rivalries and Friendship 
Lamadrid's main rivals are Comunicaciones and JJ Urquiza. It also has rivalries with Excursionistas, Defensores de Belgrano, Argentino de Merlo, L. N Alem, and San Martín de Burzaco. 

Other rivalries are Deportivo Riestra, Sacachispas, San Miguel, Luján, Central Ballester, Cañuelas, Acassuso, Brown de Adrogué, and Berazategui among others. On the other hand, Lamadrid built a strong friendship with Ituzaingó.

Current squad
As of june 09, 2018.

Titles
Primera C (1): 2010–11
Primera D (1): 1977

References

External links
 
 

Association football clubs established in 1950
General Lamadrid
1950 establishments in Argentina